This is a list of films produced in Zambia:

Killing Heat (1981)

References 

Zambia

Films